The Day River is a river in Vietnam. It was formerly known as Hát River ( or ) or Gián Khẩu River.  The river is a distributary of the Red River, draining into the Gulf of Tonkin.

The river has a length of 240 km and has a drainage basin of more than 7,500 km2, flowing through Hanoi, and the provinces of Hòa Bình, Hà Nam, Ninh Bình and Nam Định.

See also
Kẽm Trống Bay

References

Rivers of Ninh Bình province
Rivers of Hà Nam province
Rivers of Nam Định province
Rivers of Hanoi
Hong River
Gulf of Tonkin
Rivers of Vietnam